Fluocortolone is a glucocorticoid used in the treatment of several conditions, including hemorrhoids.

It is similar to fluocortin, but with one less keto group.

See also
 Corticosteroids

References

Glucocorticoids
Organofluorides